Boles Township is an inactive township in Franklin County, in the U.S. state of Missouri.

Boles Township was established in 1821, taking its name from Ambrose Boles, a pioneer citizen.

References

Townships in Missouri
Townships in Franklin County, Missouri